Deipnias was a town in ancient Thessaly near Larissa. It is noted in Greek mythology as the place where Apollo broke his fast after he returned laurate from the Vale of Tempe.

Its site has not been located.

References

Populated places in ancient Thessaly
Former populated places in Greece
Lost ancient cities and towns
Locations in Greek mythology